This is a list of seasons of the Greater Brisbane League.

Pre-War Fixtures

Queensland Baseball Association Fixtures

Metropolitan Baseball Fixtures

Brisbane Baseball Association Fixtures

Greater Brisbane League

Notes
  It is written in Queensland Baseball History as Valleys dominated the season, but never directly mentioned they won the competition as the 1932 season was an informal set of fixtures between the four inaugural clubs, Western Suburbs, Eastern Suburbs, Valleys and Toombul.
  The 2020 finals series was cancelled due to the COVID-19 pandemic. Pine Hills were declared the winners after leading the standings at the conclusion of the regular season

Greater Brisbane League
Greater Brisbane League